OSB-Törekent is an underground rapid transit station and the western terminus of the M3 line of the Ankara Metro. The station is located along Ahmet Andiçen Avenue and was opened on 12 February 2014.

References

External links
EGO Ankara - Official website
Ankaray - Official website

Railway stations opened in 2014
Ankara metro stations
2014 establishments in Turkey